The Goldbeter–Koshland kinetics   describe a steady-state solution for a 2-state biological system. In this system, the interconversion between these two states is performed by two enzymes with opposing effect. One example would be a protein Z that exists in a phosphorylated form ZP and in an unphosphorylated form Z; the corresponding kinase Y and phosphatase X interconvert the two forms. In this case we would be interested in the equilibrium concentration of the protein Z (Goldbeter–Koshland kinetics only describe equilibrium properties, thus no dynamics can be modeled). It has many applications in the description of biological systems.

The Goldbeter–Koshland kinetics is described by the Goldbeter–Koshland function:
 
with the constants
 

Graphically the function takes values between 0 and 1 and has a sigmoid behavior. The smaller the parameters J1 and J2 the steeper the function gets and the more of a switch-like behavior is observed. Goldbeter–Koshland kinetics is an example of ultrasensitivity.

Derivation
Since equilibrium properties are searched one can write
 
Here the KM stand for the Michaelis–Menten constant which describes how well the enzymes X and Y bind and catalyze the conversion whereas the kinetic parameters k1 and k2 denote the rate constants for the catalyzed reactions. Assuming that the total concentration of Z is constant one can additionally write that [Z]0 = [ZP] + [Z] and one thus gets:
 

with the constants

 

If we thus solve the quadratic equation (1) for z we get:

 

Thus (3) is a solution to the initial equilibrium problem and describes the equilibrium concentration of [Z] and [ZP] as a function of the kinetic parameters of the phosphorylation and dephosphorylation reaction and the concentrations of the kinase and phosphatase. The solution is the Goldbeter–Koshland function with the constants from (2):

Ultrasensitivity of Goldbeter–Koshland modules 
The ultrasensitivity (sigmoidality) of a Goldbeter–Koshland module can be measured by its Hill Coefficient:

.

where EC90 and EC10 are the input values needed to produce the 10% and 90% of the maximal response, respectively.

In a living cell, Goldbeter–Koshland modules are embedded in a bigger network with upstream and downstream components. This components may constrain the range of inputs that the module will receive as well as the range of the module’s outputs that network will be able to detect. Altszyler et al. (2014)  studied how the effective ultrasensitivity of a modular system is affected by these restrictions. They found that Goldbeter–Koshland modules are highly sensitive to dynamic range limitations imposed by downstream components. However, in the case of asymmetric Goldbeter–Koshland modules, a moderate downstream constrain can produce effective sensitivities much larger than that of the original module when considered in isolation.

References 

Enzyme kinetics
Chemical kinetics
Ordinary differential equations
Catalysis